Night Mail, also known as Concerto or Britain's Railway, was a 1988 British advert produced by Ridley Scott Associates and British Transport Films for British Rail. It was based on the 1936 documentary of the same name, and used the first stanza of a poem by W. H. Auden that was written for the film. Further verses in the style of Auden were written to accompany the footage, read out by actor Tom Courtenay.

The advert showcased the newly created business sectors of British Rail (including InterCity, Network South East, Provincial, Railfreight and Parcels) and was the last advert to promote the network as a whole before privatisation in 1997. It was directed by Hugh Hudson and featured music by Greek composer Vangelis.

Documentary 

The advert was inspired by the GPO Film Unit's 24-minute film Night Mail, which documents the journey of the nightly "Postal Special" travelling from London to Scotland. This film was directed and produced by Harry Watt and Basil Wright, and ended with a specially commissioned poem by W. H. Auden. The documentary was critically acclaimed at the time, and a sequel was created for its 50th anniversary in 1986.

Production 
The advert was filmed in September 1988, and featured aerial shots of famous structures including the Forth Tyne and Saltash bridges, that – although impressive – made it very expensive to produce.

The opening shot is of a Travelling Post Office, as Tom Courtenay begins to recite Auden's poem:

Courtenay then breaks from the original verse as the video goes on to detail British Rail's freight operations:

The narration then stops as a montage of aerial shots set to Vangelis' score is shown. The voiceover then restarts with a commentary of commuter trains, including the newly introduced Class 442 Wessex Electrics:

The advert then ends with a shot of disembarking passengers, and a title card with the slogan "Britain's Railway".

Release 
The advert premiered in the UK at 9pm on Christmas Day 1988. It became apparent that the 2½ minute running time (as well as being expensive to air) limited the amount of showings it could receive, so an abridged 90 second version was later released.

See also 
 Age Of The Train

References

External links 
 Watch "Night Mail" at the History of Advertising Trust

 British Rail
 History of rail transport in Great Britain
1980s television commercials
British television commercials